Piedade is Portuguese for pity and may refer to:

Places

Brazil
Piedade, São Paulo, a city in the State of São Paulo
Piedade (Rio de Janeiro), a neighborhood of Rio de Janeiro

Portugal
Piedade (Lajes do Pico), a civil parish in the municipality of Lajes do Pico, Pico Island, Azores

India
Piedade, Goa, a village in the state of Goa

Persons with the surname 
Daniela Piedade (born 1979), Brazilian handball player
Diana Piedade (born 1985), Portuguese singer
Frederica Piedade (born 1982), Portuguese tennis player
Wesley Karlos Piedade (born 1989), Brazilian association football player

See also